Jawid Mojaddedi is an Afghan researcher and professor.

Early life 
Mojaddedi was born in Kabul, Afghanistan. At age five, along with his mother and brother, he moved to Great Britain. 

During the 1990s, Jawid Mojaddedi attended University of Manchester, where he earned his BA and PhD in Middle Eastern Studies.

Career 
He graduated from the University of Manchester. He then worked as a full-time faculty member of the Department of Middle Eastern Studies, where he taught Arabic and Islamic Studies.

In 1998, Jawid moved from Great Britain to the United States. He worked at Columbia University for two years as an editor of Encyclopædia Iranica. He began teaching at Rutgers University in 2003. He has served as chair of the Department of Religion there and as Director of the Center for Middle Eastern Studies.

Works 
Mojaddedi is a Rumi expert. His published books include translations of Rumi's longest poem, known as the Masnavi, into simple English. The Masnavi: Book One was published in 2004 and was awarded the Lois Roth Prize for excellence in translation of Persian literature by the American Institute of Iranian Studies. He continued with The Masnavi: Book Two in 2007, The Masnavi: Book Three in 2013, The Masnavi: Book Four in 2017 and The Masnavi: Book Five in 2022. All five volumes were published as Oxford World's Classics Editions. This project has been supported by a literature translation fellowship from the National Endowment for the Arts in 2015. Mojaddedi was also awarded a fellowship from the National Endowment for the Humanities in 2018 to support the progress of this project.

Mojaddedi's analytical study, Beyond Dogma: Rumi's Teachings on Friendship with God and Early Sufi Theories, was published by Oxford University Press in 2012.

Bibliography
The Biographical Tradition in Sufism: The Tabaqat Genre from Al-Sulami to Jami (2001)
Beyond Dogma: Rumi's Teachings on Friendship with God and Early Sufi Theories (2012)

The Masnavi (Oxford World's Classics)
The Masnavi: Book One (2004) Lois Roth Prize for excellence in translation of Persian literature by the American Institute of Iranian Studies (2005)
The Masnavi: Book Two (2007)
The Masnavi: Book Three (2013)
The Masnavi: Book Four (2017)
The Masnavi: Book Five (2022)

As Co-Editor
Wiley Blackwell Companion to the Qur'an, 2nd Edition (2017)
Classical Islam: A Sourcebook of Religious Literature, 2nd Edition (2012)
Interpretation and Jurisprudence in Medieval Islam (2006)

References

External links 
 
 

Living people
Alumni of the Victoria University of Manchester
Academics of the Victoria University of Manchester
Rutgers University faculty
People from Kabul
Year of birth missing (living people)